Eric J. Johnson is a professor of marketing at Columbia University where he is the inaugural holder of the Norman Eig Chair of Business. He is the Co-Director for the Center for Decision Sciences.

Education
Johnson received a B.A. in Human Communication from Rutgers University in 1976 and an M.S. and PhD in Psychology from Carnegie-Mellon University in 1978 and 1980 respectively. After completing his degree, he was a National Science Foundation post-doctoral fellow at Stanford University for one year.

Career 
He began his professional career at Carnegie-Mellon University in 1981 as an Assistant Professor of Industrial Administration at the Graduate School of Industrial Administration. He was an Associate Professor there from 1984-1987. Between 1984 and 1985, he was a visiting scholar at MIT Sloan School of Management. From 1992 to 1999, he was a Professor of Marketing, Decision Science and Psychology at the University of Pennsylvania and the inaugural holder of the David W. Hauck Chair in Marketing. In 1999, he joined Columbia University as a Professor of Business..

Johnson's research explores the interface between behavioral decision research and economics. He looks at the decisions made by consumers and managers, and their implications for public policy, markets and marketing. Johnson has explored a wide range of topics, including how the way options are presented to decision-makers affect their choices in areas such as organ donation, the choice of environmentally friendly products, and investments. He is one of the original developers of Query Theory and has done work on how memory informs preferences. He has also done work on process tracing and was one of the co-developers of Mouselab Web, a tool used to monitor decision makers information acquisition on the web.  Recently, Johnson's work has focused on choice architecture and its influences on public policy.

He served as an Associate Editor of the Journal of Consumer Psychology, and i s the Senior Editor for Decision Sciences at Behavioral Science and Policy.

Writing 
He has co-authored two books: Decision Research: A Field Guide and The Adaptive Decision-Maker.

Awards and honors 
In 2009, he was awarded an honorary doctorate in Economics from the University of St. Gallen for "trail-blazing work in the field of Behavioral Economics”

In 2013, he was named a fellow of the Association for Consumer Research.

References

Carnegie Mellon University alumni

Living people
Rutgers University alumni

American marketing people
Columbia Business School faculty
University of Pennsylvania faculty
Year of birth missing (living people)